The following is the 1994–95 network television schedule for the six major English language commercial broadcast networks in the United States. The schedule covers primetime hours from September 1994 through August 1995. The schedule is followed by a list per network of returning series, new series, and series cancelled after the 1993–94 season. All times are Eastern and Pacific, with certain exceptions, such as Monday Night Football. This was the first season to feature the United Paramount Network and The WB Television Network, as both launched in January 1995. Both networks would ultimately shutdown and form The CW in September 2006.

New series highlighted in bold.

Each of the 30 highest-rated shows is listed with its rank and rating in parenthesis (#rank / rating), as determined by Nielsen Media Research.

 Yellow indicates the programs in the top 10 for the season.
 Cyan indicates the programs in the top 20 for the season.
 Magenta indicates the programs in the top 30 for the season.
Other Legend
 Light blue indicates local programming.
 Gray indicates encore programming.
 Blue-gray indicates news programming.
 Light green indicates sporting events.
 Light Purple indicates movies. 
 Red indicates series being burned off and other regularly scheduled programs, including specials.

PBS is not included; member stations have local flexibility over most of their schedules and broadcast times for network shows may vary.

Sunday 

NOTE: The Great Defender aired its pilot episode on FOX at 7pm ET on March 5, 1995. FOX cancelled the show before the 2nd episode aired. Episodes already made before being cancelled aired on Mondays in the summer.

Monday 

(*) UPN premiered the first episode of Star Trek: Voyager, following with the network's Monday night comedies (Platypus Man and Pig Sty) a week later.

Tuesday

Wednesday 

(*) The WB premiered a New Comedy Wednesday Line-Up

Thursday

Friday

Saturday

By network

ABC

Returning series
20/20
The ABC Sunday Night Movie
America's Funniest Home Videos
Baseball Night in America
Boy Meets World
Coach
The Commish
Day One
Ellen 
Family Matters
Full House
Grace Under Fire
Hangin' with Mr. Cooper
Home Improvement
Lois & Clark: The New Adventures of Superman
Matlock
Monday Night Football
NYPD Blue
Primetime Live
Roseanne
Sister, Sister
Step by Step
Thunder Alley
Turning Point

New series
All-American Girl
Blue Skies
Bringing up Jack *
Extreme *
The Marshal *
McKenna
Me and the Boys
My So-Called Life
On Our Own
A Whole New Ballgame *

Not returning from 1993–94:
America's Funniest People
Birdland
The Byrds of Paradise
The Critic (moved to Fox)
Dinosaurs
FBI: The Untold Stories
George
Joe's Life
Missing Persons
Moon Over Miami
The Paula Poundstone Show
Phenom
She TV
Thea
Where I Live

CBS

Returning series
48 Hours
60 Minutes
Burke's Law
CBS Sunday Movie
Christy
Dave's World
Diagnosis: Murder
Dr. Quinn, Medicine Woman
Eye to Eye with Connie Chung
Hearts Afire
Love & War
Muddling Through
Murder, She Wrote
Murphy Brown
The Nanny
Northern Exposure
Picket Fences
Rescue 911
Walker, Texas Ranger

New series
The Boys Are Back
Chicago Hope
Cybill *
Daddy's Girls
Double Rush *
Due South
The 5 Mrs. Buchanans
The George Wendt Show *
The Office *
Touched by an Angel
Under One Roof *
Under Suspicion
Women of the House *
The Wright Verdicts *

Not returning from 1993–94:
704 Hauser
America Tonight
Angel Falls
Family Album
Good Advice
Harts of the West
Hotel Malibu
It Had to Be You
One West Waikiki
The Road Home
Second Chances
South of Sunset
Tom
Traps

Fox

Returning series
America's Most Wanted
Beverly Hills, 90210
COPS
The Critic (moved from ABC)
Encounters: The Hidden Truth
FOX Night At The Movies
The George Carlin Show
Living Single
Married... with Children
Martin
Melrose Place
Models Inc.
The Simpsons
The X-Files

New series
Dream On * (Originally aired on HBO)
Fortune Hunter
Get Smart *
The Great Defender *
Hardball
House of Buggin' *
M.A.N.T.I.S.
Medicine Ball *
My Wildest Dreams *
New York Undercover
Party of Five
Sliders *
VR.5 *
Wild Oats

Not returning from 1993–94:
The Adventures of Brisco County, Jr.
Bakersfield P.D.
Code 3
Comic Strip Live
Daddy Dearest
The Front Page
Herman's Head
In Living Color
Monty
Roc
The Sinbad Show
South Central
Townsend Television

NBC

Returning series
Blossom
Dateline NBC
Empty Nest
Frasier
The Fresh Prince of Bel-Air
Homicide: Life on the Street
The John Larroquette Show
Law & Order
Mad About You
The Mommies
NBC Sunday Night Movie
The NBC Monday Movie
seaQuest DSV
Seinfeld
Sisters
Unsolved Mysteries
Wings

New series
Amazing Grace *
The Cosby Mysteries
Earth 2
ER
Friends
High Sierra Search and Rescue *
Hope & Gloria *
In the House *
Madman of the People
The Martin Short Show
NewsRadio
Pride & Joy *
Something Wilder
Sweet Justice
Time Life's Lost Civilizations *

Not returning from 1993–94:
Against the Grain
Café Americain
Getting By
The Good Life
I Witness Video
L.A. Law
Nurses
Now with Tom Brokaw and Katie Couric
Saved by the Bell: The College Years
The Second Half
Someone Like Me
Viper
Winnetka Road

UPN
Legend
Marker
Pig Sty
Platypus Man
Star Trek: Voyager
The Watcher

The WB
Muscle
The Parent 'Hood
Unhappily Ever After
The Wayans Bros.

Note: The * indicates that the program was introduced in midseason.

References

United States primetime network television schedules
United States Network Television Schedule, 1994-95
United States Network Television Schedule, 1994-95